Frio is a solo album released by Robi Draco Rosa following his departure from the band, Maggie's Dream.  Although widely considered Rosa's debut solo effort, the album is actually his third, as he had released two little-known Portuguese-language solo albums in the late 1980s.

Track listing

 "Cruzando Puertas" 	
 "Y Que Me Importa"
 "Cuando Pasara"	
 "Frio"	
 "Mama"	
 "Guajira"	
 "Tu Tren Se Va"		
 "Casi Una Diosa" 		
 "Pasion"		
 "Camaron"
 "Almas Diferentes/Almas Gemelas"		
 "Volver"		
 "Mama Hue"

1994 albums
Draco Rosa albums